Antônio Euzébio Dias Ferreira (born 2 March 1960) is a retired Brazilian hurdler.

He won the 400 m hurdles bronze medal at the 1981 Summer Universiade. He became South American champion in 1979 and 1981.

He participated in 4 × 400 metres relay at the 1980 Summer Olympics, the 1983 World Championships and the 1984 Summer Olympics (only in the initial heat in the latter case).

Achievements

References

External links
 
 

1960 births
Living people
Brazilian male hurdlers
Athletes (track and field) at the 1980 Summer Olympics
Athletes (track and field) at the 1984 Summer Olympics
Olympic athletes of Brazil
Athletes (track and field) at the 1979 Pan American Games
Athletes (track and field) at the 1983 Pan American Games
Athletes (track and field) at the 1987 Pan American Games
Pan American Games medalists in athletics (track and field)
Pan American Games silver medalists for Brazil
Universiade medalists in athletics (track and field)
Universiade bronze medalists for Brazil
Medalists at the 1981 Summer Universiade
Medalists at the 1979 Pan American Games
Medalists at the 1983 Pan American Games
21st-century Brazilian people
20th-century Brazilian people